Infield House (also known as 'Infield Park', or simply 'Infield') was a large late-19th century country house located to the north of Barrow-in-Furness, Cumbria, England. Infield House was built adjacent to Abbey Road as a residence for businessman Samuel John Claye, the owner of Claye's Wagon Works. After Claye's death in 1886, the house and Wagon Works were sold on and later became a convalescent home. The facilities closure lead to Infield House falling into a state of disrepair and it was eventually demolished in the 1970s and replaced by a housing estate named Infield Gardens. The only remaining feature of Infield House is the boundary wall and gate piers which mark the entrance to the modern housing estate.

References
 Furness Hidden Heritage: Claye's Wagon Works and Infield House

Former buildings and structures in Barrow-in-Furness